"Unforgiven" is a song by Northern Irish musical group D:Ream, released in July 1993 as the third single from their debut album, D:Ream On Volume 1 (1993). Written by band members Peter Cunnah and Al MacKenzie, it peaked at number 29 in the UK and number ten in Portugal. After the success of the singles "U R the Best Thing" and "Things Can Only Get Better", it was re-released in 1994. A music video was also produced to promote the single.

Critical reception
Pan-European magazine Music & Media wrote that "a harmonica whirls prominently through this alternative electro pop/dance song, and wails towards the end like the one featured in the Once Upon The West film". The reviewer also felt that "although it already peaked in the UK, this throbbing, head-bobbing track is infectious and could go far on the Continent." Andy Beevers from Music Week gave it four out of five, calling it "another big, bold song that looks like following both "U R The Best Thing" and "Things Can Only Get Better" into the Top 40. Their own mix has a Balearic flavour with its wailing harmonica." In an retrospective review, Pop Rescue remarked that "this is quite a downbeat mellow track", complimenting the vocals by Linda Duggan as "big". They also noted "a little harmonica line." James Hamilton from the RM Dance Update described it as "sombre humming but bright harmonica washed cantering".

Track listings

Charts

References

 

1993 singles
D Ream songs
1993 songs
Magnet Records singles
Songs written by Peter Cunnah